Lunella cinerea, common name the smooth moon turban, is a species of sea snail, a marine gastropod mollusk in the family Turbinidae, the turban snails.

Description
The size of the shell varies between 20 mm and 50 mm. The solid, umbilicate shell has a depressed-globose shape with a strong spiral sculpture. The spire is obtuse. The suture is slightly undulating. The five whorls are spirally lirate, and with lirulae in the interstices.

Distribution
This species occurs in the tropical Indo-West Pacific, off the Andaman Islands and Nicobar Islands, the Philippines, in the Red Sea, and off Australia (Northern Territory, Queensland, Western Australia).

References

 Born, I. von 1778. Index rerum naturalium Musei Caesarei Vindobonensis, pl. 1, Testacea. - Verzeichniss etc. Illust. Vindobonae. Vienna : J.P. Krauss xlii 458 pp.
 Gmelin J.F. 1791. Caroli a Linné. Systema Naturae per regna tria naturae, secundum classes, ordines, genera, species, cum characteribus, differentiis, synonymis, locis. Lipsiae : Georg. Emanuel. Beer Vermes. Vol. 1(Part 6) pp. 3021–3910.
 Couthouy, J.P., 1839. Descriptions of new species of Mollusca and shells, and remarks on several polypi found in Massachusetts Bay. Boston J. nat. Hist. 2 : 53–111
 Reeve, L.A. 1848. Monograph of the genus Turbo. pls 1-13 in Reeve, L.A. (ed). Conchologia Iconica. London : L. Reeve & Co. Vol. 4. 
 Wilson, B. 1993. Australian Marine Shells. Prosobranch Gastropods. Kallaroo, Western Australia : Odyssey Publishing Vol. 1 408 pp. 
 Wilson, B. 2002. A Handbook to Australian Seashells on Seashores East to West and North to South. Sydney : Reed New Holland 185 pp.
 Subba Rao, N.V. 2003. Indian Seashells (Part 1). Records of the Zoological Survey of India, Occasional Paper (192): 1–416

External links
 

cinerea
Gastropods described in 1778